Jumana Taha (born in Jableh in 1941) is a Syrian writer, member of the Association for Research and Studies, and librarian of the Arab Broadcasting Union. Her books include Juman in Proverbs, a comparative historical study, and the short story collection Sinbad in a Deferred Journey.

Early life and education 

Taha lived most of her life in Syria, where she took a degree in Arabic from Damascus University.

Career 

Her books include: Seduction of Memories; the novel When the Doors Speak, about the Arab Writers Union in the Syrian capital Damascus; and Encyclopedia of Arab Folk Proverbs: A Comparative Historical Study; Encyclopedia of Masterpieces in Judgment and Proverbs.

Works 

 Sinbad on a Deferred Journey (a short story collection)
 The seduction of memories from travel literature
 When the doors speak
 Encyclopedia of Arabic Folk Proverbs: A Comparative Historical Study
 Encyclopedia of masterpieces in governance and proverbs

References 

1941 births
Living people
20th-century Syrian writers
Syrian women writers
Librarians
Women librarians